Pilosocereus alensis, the Sonoran old man cactus, is a species of cactus native to Western Mexico, from Sonora south to Jalisco. The hairs protect the flower buds. Flowers open at night in June and give off the odor of ammonia, attracting bats for pollination. The juicy fruit is tasty.

References

Cactoideae
Flora of Mexico